Dirk van der Ven (born 1 March 1970) is a German former professional footballer who played as a striker. He spent two seasons in the Bundesliga with Arminia Bielefeld.

External links

1970 births
Living people
German people of Dutch descent
Footballers from Duisburg
German footballers
Association football forwards
SG Wattenscheid 09 players
1. FC Schweinfurt 05 players
Rot Weiss Ahlen players
KFC Uerdingen 05 players
Arminia Bielefeld players
Yokohama FC players
Rot-Weiss Essen players
FC Gütersloh 2000 players
Bundesliga players
2. Bundesliga players
J2 League players
German expatriate footballers
German expatriate sportspeople in Japan
Expatriate footballers in Japan
West German footballers